The Fresno State Bulldogs college football team competes as part of the National Collegiate Athletic Association (NCAA) Division I Football Bowl Subdivision (FBS), representing California State University, Fresno in the Mountain West Conference (MW). Since the establishment of the team in 1921, Fresno State has appeared in 30 bowl games. The latest bowl occurred on December 17, 2022, when Fresno State won over Washington State 29–6 in the LA Bowl. The win in that game brought the Bulldogs' overall bowl record to sixteen wins and fourteen losses (16–14).

Key

Bowl games

Notes

References
General

Specific

Fresno State Bulldogs

Fresno State Bulldog
Fresno State Bulldogs bowl games